Akku is a 2008 Indian Tamil-language action thriller film directed by Maamani. The film stars Ajay, Sriji, Rakshai, Riyaz Khan and Anu Haasan, with Ram Khan, Harris, Vijay Kumar, Biju, Radio One Balaji, Jayashree, Lakshmi and Ammu Ramachandran playing supporting roles. It was released on 22 February 2008.

Plot
Siva (Ajay) is an IT professional who grew up in an orphanage, and he falls in love with Bhanu (Sriji). Her brother (Rakshai) is a dreaded terrorist leader planning to bomb Chennai city. Bhanu elopes with Siva as she is afraid that her brother would not permit their marriage, and they arrive in a forest, but they are soon caught by Bhanu's brother and the members of the terrorist organisation in the middle of the night. Bhanu's brother beats Siva up, takes him to the heart of the city, puts a bomb in his shoe and abandons him. Bhanu's brother tells him to keep running to stay alive. If Siva stops running or slows down, the bomb in his shoe would explode, killing him and also triggering a chain of explosions. The terrorist leader then calls the police, and he sends them a MMS to track down Siva. He also challenges them to save Siva and Chennai city.

A police team is pressed into service to defuse the bomb and save Siva and the city. The assistant commissioner of police Aadhi Narayanan (Riyaz Khan), the bomb squad officer Anu (Anu Haasan), and the doctor Devi (Jayashree) start following Siva in cars. The incident receives heavy media attention, and it is broadcast live by all the news channels. The dawn is coming with the sun, and Siva is exhausted. Meanwhile, Bhanu is locked in a room by her brother in his place and calls the police to save her. Devi ensures that he does not collapse from exhaustion, she provides him with energy tablets and oxygen supply. Anu even scans his shoe for the bomb and finds uranium in his shoe.

The terrorist leader orders the members of his organisation to stop Siva from running, and they try to kill him. The police manage to kill them, but one terrorist shoots with a RPG and the car of Aadhi Narayanan exploded. Aadhi Narayanan is severely injured after the attack. The police catch the terrorist and start torturing him to quickly obtain information from him. Meanwhile, the special force eventually finds out where Bhanu has been kidnapped and saves her. The special force and the terrorist organisation begin to exchange fire in the area. The terrorists, including Bhanu's brother, are killed, and the special force won the battle. Anu decides to defuse the bomb and leads Siva in a remote place where the police set up a treadmill for him. A tired Siva starts running on the treadmill, and Anu, who wears a bomb suit, orders the police to move away from the place. Siva is hooked by a crane and Anu orders him to jump, at that moment, she puts an adhesive surface under his shoes, and the crane lifted him at an unbelievable speed. The shoe soles stick to the adhesive surface tearing up his shoes, and the bomb exploded without causing any casualties. At the hospital, Anu meets an exhausted Siva and his lover Bhanu, and Anu congratulates him for his braveness.

Cast

 Ajay as Siva
 Sriji as Bhanu
 Rakshai as Bhanu's brother
 Riyaz Khan as Aadhi Narayanan
 Anu Haasan as Anu 
 Ram Khan as the Police inspector
 Harris
 Vijay Kumar
 Biju
 Radio One Balaji as a Radio jockey
 Jayashree as Devi
 Lakshmi as Priya
 Ammu Ramachandran as Savitha
 Appukutty as Man at the barbershop (uncredited role)

Production
Maamani, who has worked under R. Balu, R. Parthiban and S. P. Jananathan, made his directorial with Akku (the last vowel in Tamil) under the banner of On Life Network. Newcomers Ajay, Sriji and Rakshai were cast to play the lead roles alongside Riyaz Khan and Anu Haasan. The film did not have an interval, songs or fights. Speaking of the film, the director said, "Since I do not want the screenplay to slow down, I decided to have no interval". The camera was handled by Chitti Babu, Sriram composed the background score and G. B. Venkatesh edited the film.

Reception
Behindwoods rated the film 3 out 5 and wrote, "There are some holes in the plot, the acting is uneven (since it involves so many novices) and the climax goes a little wrong. But these are minor flaws in an otherwise deftly conceived and shot thriller. Akku could blaze a new trend in Kollywood of taut genre thrillers, minus songs and dances". Sify said, "Akku is an attempt at a different type of thriller not seen in Tamil film genre which has human emotions and cinematic heroism to keep the audiences engrossed". Indiaglitz wrote, "'Akku' is a different attempt in Tamil by a set of newcomers. Maamani and his team should be commended for their effort to make a film which provides thrilling entertainment without adhering to the set rules of commercial films". Nowrunning rated the film 2.5 out of 5 and stated, "Sri Ram's background score is apt for a thriller. Chittibabu's camera work and Venkatesh's crisp editing enhance quality. Slick and action-packed, "Akku" is a new experience in Tamil cinema". Another reviewer rated the film 3 out of 5 and wrote, "Though there are one or two loopholes, the film overall was a great effort, and the makers should be appreciated to come up with something so fresh and daring from the regular mainstream cinema". Another critic said, "It has many good twists and turns that will keep you interested and on the edge of your seat! It seems that the director has been influenced by thrillers like Speed, and he reworks perfectly and presents with an apt screenplay".

References

2008 films
2000s Tamil-language films
Indian action thriller films
2008 directorial debut films
2008 action thriller films